Heikki Lunta is the embodiment of the Finnish snow god character who originated in the mythology of the Upper Peninsula of Michigan.
The character of Heikki Lunta is a product of the heavy Finnish-American presence in Michigan's Keweenaw Upper Peninsula combined with a tremendous annual snowfall.  Over time, the biography of Heikki Lunta has been expanded through stage plays and children's stories.  These feature his origins in central Finland as the son of Eljas and Saima Lunta.  He has named siblings and may have married his childhood sweetheart, who is named Aino Mäkinen.  Over time, the character has become an important part of local culture, enough to generate a significant number of news articles and scholarly papers.

History
David Riutta created "Heikki Lunta" (the name translates to "Hank Snow" in English) in 1970. When an upcoming snowmobile race hosted by the Range Snowmobile Club of Atlantic Mine was endangered by the lack of snowfall, Riutta, a worker at WMPL in Hancock, aired the "Heikki Lunta Snowdance Song". The song goes on to ask "Heikki Lunta," the Finnish snow god, for snow in time for the race. According to local tales, the snow fell and fell, until there was too much. People were superstitious that Riutta's song had caused too much snow for the race, so in response to public outcry, Riutta recorded a separate track entitled, "Heikki Lunta Go Away." The 45 showcased each song on alternate sides.

See also
Jack Frost
Paul Bunyan
Rain dance
Saint Urho

References

External links
Not Just Talking About the Weather: Tradition, Social Change and Heikki Lunta, Hilary Virtanen
Heikki Lunta (song), lyrics from Da Yoopers 1991 release, "Yoopy do Wah"
Heikki Lunta - A Modern Copper Country Folk Hero, Jim Kurtti
Guess Who's Coming to Sauna? (Heikki Lunta) by Conga Se Menne
Heikki Lunta Snow Dance and other traditions

Upper Peninsula of Michigan
Fakelore
Fictional Finnish people
Finnish-American culture in Michigan
Hancock, Michigan
Michigan folklore